Cunningham-Hevener House is a historic home located at Upper Tract, Pendleton County, West Virginia. It was built about 1880, and is a two-story, "T"-shaped  Greek Revival / Italian Villa style masonry dwelling.  It features a full width, two-story porch supported by Ionic order columns.

It was listed on the National Register of Historic Places in 1985.

References

Houses on the National Register of Historic Places in West Virginia
Italianate architecture in West Virginia
Houses completed in 1880
Houses in Pendleton County, West Virginia
National Register of Historic Places in Pendleton County, West Virginia